St. Timothy's School is a four-year private all-girls boarding high school in Stevenson, Maryland.

History
The school was founded as a school for girls by Sarah Randolph Carter in Catonsville, Maryland in 1882. In 1952, the school moved to Stevenson, Maryland. In 1972, Hannah More Academy merged into St. Timothy's School. The school is run under the guidance of the Episcopal Church, and offers the International Baccalaureate Diploma Program.

Sports

The school supports several sports programs including lacrosse, golf, tennis, dance, softball, field hockey, indoor soccer, volleyball, horse riding, ice hockey, soccer, squash and badminton. The school competes in the Interscholastic Athletic Association (IAAM). In 2004-2005, the school won the Division C Championship in field hockey and basketball.

The school is also known for its annual intramural basketball game, a tradition that began in the 1890s when co-headmistresses Polly and Sally Carter were looking for an activity to keep boarders busy during the Thanksgiving break. They divided up the girls into two teams named "Brownie" and "Spider". The game has been played each year according to the original three-court rules, with players wearing 19th-century tunics.

Notable alumnae

 Liz Claiborne - fashion designer
 Helen Metcalf Danforth (1887–1984), university president.
 Kimberly Dozier - CBS Reporter who was critically wounded in Iraq War
 Edie Sedgwick - socialite, actress, model, and 'It' girl of 1965
 Sunny von Bülow - heiress and socialite made famous by allegations that her husband attempted to murder her
 Marietta Peabody Tree - a human rights representative under John F. Kennedy and the mother of model Penelope Tree
 Mary Pillsbury Lord - former U.S. delegate to the United Nations General Assembly
 Leila Hadley - socialite and author
 Sophie Drinker - musicologist
 Ernesta Drinker Ballard - horticulturalist and feminist

See also
List of Schools in Baltimore County, Maryland

References and notes

External links
 

Educational institutions established in 1882
Private high schools in Maryland
Private schools in Baltimore County, Maryland
International Baccalaureate schools in Maryland
Girls' schools in Maryland
Stevenson, Maryland
1882 establishments in Maryland
Episcopal schools in Maryland
Boarding schools in Maryland